They Came to Rob Las Vegas is a 1968 crime film directed by Antonio Isasi-Isasmendi and starring Gary Lockwood, Elke Sommer, Lee J. Cobb, and Jack Palance. The screenplay concerns a crime outfit who plan a heist to rob a hi-tech truck containing $7 million in Las Vegas. Its Spanish title was Las Vegas 500 Milliones. Filming took place in California, Nevada, and Spain.

Plot
Steve Skorsky has built himself a reputation in security transport for financial institutions. His security trucks are considered impregnable with armed guards and computer controlled routing. No one has ever successfully raided a Skorsky truck until, ...... They came to rob Las Vegas.

Gino Vincenzo escapes from prison and plans to rob a Skorsky truck with his brother Tony in an armed assault, but Tony turns down the idea saying it needs more modern planning. Gino goes ahead anyway and he and his gang are killed in the attempt.

Tony plans a new robbery, but Inspector Douglas of the Treasury is also after Skorsky as he uses his trucks to move gold for the Mafia. Tony takes a job as a dealer in a Las Vegas casino in order to seduce Ann Bennett who is Skorsky’s secretary and also his mistress. She is a compulsive gambler and Tony helps her to win in return for a share of the profits. She falls in love with him and he persuades her to provide the information he needs to ambush a Skorsky truck in the Nevada desert. He and his gang hide the truck in an underground bunker where they will have time to either persuade the crew to come out, or break into it, but impatience gets the better of the gang members who try to employ their own methods. The plan starts to disintegrate as Inspector Douglas, Steve Skorsky, and the Mafia all try to find the truck which seems to have vanished. Tony eventually succeeds, but Ann urges him to forget about the money and run away with her so that they can be together. It’s then that she realises it was never about the money. It was about ruining Skorsky’s reputation in revenge for the death of Tony’s brother.

Cast 
 Gary Lockwood – Tony Vincenzo/Tony Ferris
 Elke Sommer – Ann Bennett
 Lee J. Cobb – Steve Skorsky
 Jean Servais – Gino Vincenzo
 Georges Géret – Leroy
 Jack Palance – Douglas
 Fabrizio Capucci – Cooper
 Roger Hanin – The Boss
 Gustavo Re – Salvatore
 Daniel Martín – Merino
 Maurizio Arena – Clark
 Enrique Ávila – Baxter
 Gérard Tichy – Sheriff Klinger
 Rubén Rojo – Brian

Locations 
US - Las Vegas Nevada, San Francisco California, Angels Flight Railway Los Angeles.
SPAIN - Tabernas, Almería, Andalucía, Madrid,  Barcelona, Catalonia.

See also
 List of films set in Las Vegas

References

Bibliography

External links
 
 

1968 films
1960s crime thriller films
1960s heist films
French crime thriller films
French heist films
German crime thriller films
German heist films
Italian crime thriller films
Italian heist films
Spanish crime thriller films
Spanish heist films
West German films
Films directed by Antonio Isasi-Isasmendi
Films set in California
Films set in Nevada
Films set in the Las Vegas Valley
Films based on French novels
Films shot in Almería
English-language French films
English-language German films
English-language Italian films
English-language Spanish films
Warner Bros. films
1960s Italian films
1960s French films
1960s German films